White Stream (also known as the Georgia–Ukraine–EU gas pipeline) is a proposed pipeline project to transport natural gas from the Caspian region to Romania and Ukraine with further supplies to Central Europe.

History
For the first time the White Stream idea was presented by Ukrainian officials in 2005. In 2006–2007, the project was discussed at different international conferences. In May 2007, it was presented at the Vienna gas forum, and on 11 October 2007, it was presented during the summit-level Energy Security Conference in Vilnius. On 28 January 2008, Prime Minister of Ukraine Yulia Tymoshenko asked the European Union to consider participating in White Stream project. On 28 May 2008, the European Commission identified the project as 'Project of Common Interest' and further flagged as a 'Priority Project' (Commission Decision C(2008) 1969 final of 28 May 2008). The Government of Georgia signed a Memorandum of Understanding with White Stream in March 2009.

The company developing the White Stream project had received co-funding for studies under EU's TEN-E programme. The first TEN-E grant was supported by the Government of Romania. The second grant was supported by the Governments of Romania, Poland and Lithuania.

The importance of White Stream grew significantly at the end of October, 2009. Continuous monopolization of energy transit routes by Turkey's AKP government through its territory led Azerbaijani government to consider diversification of its exports within South Caucasus by potentially using White Stream for Azerbaijani gas to reach Europe.  The option was laid out by Azerbaijani President Ilham Aliyev along with previously considered onshore routes through Russia and Iran during his recent special session on gas issues.

Route
The pipeline would branch off from the South Caucasus Pipeline near Tbilisi and run for  via Georgia to Supsa at the Black Sea. From Supsa there are two possible offshore routes. In this case, the long connection to Crimea would be built at the later stage. Another option is that the pipeline would run to Constanţa through Crimea. It would allow to diversify supplies for Poland, Lithuania, and Slovakia.

In Constanţa, gas from White Stream was to supply demand in Romania and neighboring markets. It was also to supply a proposed onshore gas pipeline running parallel to the planned Pan-European Oil Pipeline, expected to run directly across the Balkan peninsula to Trieste in north-east Italy or possibly to the Baumgarten gas hub in Austria.

Technical features
At the first stage the initial capacity of pipeline was to be  of natural gas per year. At this stage the pipeline would be supplied from the Shah Deniz gas field from the Azerbaijan's Caspian offshore sector.

In Crimea most likely larger-diameter new pipelines would be used where existing  diameter pipelines do not have adequate capacity.
It was proposed to use J-Lay barges to lay the pipes on the seabed.

The pipeline was expected to commence commercial operations in 2016.

Project company
The project was promoted by a London-based GUEU – White Stream Pipeline Company. The composition of the consortium was not disclosed. According to Vladimir Socor, the consortium was led by the London-based Pipeline Systems Engineering and the New-York-based Radon-Ishizumi consulting and engineering firms.

See also

 Energy in Georgia (country)
 Energy in Ukraine

References

Proposed natural gas pipelines in Georgia (country)
Natural gas pipelines in Ukraine
Natural gas pipelines in Romania
Proposed pipelines in Europe
Georgia (country)–Romania relations
Georgia (country)–Ukraine relations
Romania–Ukraine relations
Black Sea energy
Joint ventures
Pipelines under the Black Sea